Tidal heating (also known as tidal working or tidal flexing) occurs through the tidal friction processes: orbital and rotational energy is dissipated as heat in either (or both) the surface ocean or interior of a planet or satellite. When an object is in an elliptical orbit, the tidal forces acting on it are stronger near periapsis than near apoapsis. Thus the deformation of the body due to tidal forces (i.e. the tidal bulge) varies over the course of its orbit, generating internal friction which heats its interior. This energy gained by the object comes from its gravitational energy, so over time in a two-body system, the initial elliptical orbit decays into a circular orbit (tidal circularization). Sustained tidal heating occurs when the elliptical orbit is prevented from circularizing due to additional gravitational forces from other bodies that keep tugging the object back into an elliptical orbit. In this more complex system, gravitational energy still is being converted to thermal energy; however, now the orbit's semimajor axis would shrink rather than its eccentricity.

Tidal heating is responsible for the geologic activity of the most volcanically active body in the Solar System: Io, a moon of Jupiter. Io's eccentricity persists as the result of its orbital resonances with the Galilean moons Europa and Ganymede. The same mechanism has provided the energy to melt the lower layers of the ice surrounding the rocky mantle of Jupiter's next-closest large moon, Europa. However, the heating of the latter is weaker, because of reduced flexing—Europa has half Io's orbital frequency and a 14% smaller radius; also, while Europa's orbit is about twice as eccentric as Io's, tidal force falls off with the cube of distance and is only a quarter as strong at Europa. Jupiter maintains the moons' orbits via tides they raise on it and thus its rotational energy ultimately powers the system. Saturn's moon Enceladus is similarly thought to have a liquid water ocean beneath its icy crust, due to tidal heating related to its resonance with Dione. The water vapor geysers which eject material from Enceladus are thought to be powered by friction generated within its interior.

This imaginary portion is defined by interplay of the body's rheology and self-gravitation. It, therefore, is a function of the body's radius, density, and rheological parameters (the shear modulus, viscosity, and others – dependent upon the rheological model). The rheological parameters' values, in turn, depend upon the temperature and the concentration of partial melt in the body's interior.

The tidally dissipated power in a nonsynchronised rotator is given by a more complex expression.

See also
 Cryovolcano
 Tidal acceleration
 Tidal locking
 Tidal heating of Io
 Io Volcano Observer
Planetary differentiation

References

Planetary science
Tidal forces